John E. Pepper Jr. (born August 2, 1938) is an American businessman. He served as chief executive officer and/or chairman of Procter & Gamble from 1995 to 2002. He was also CEO of the National Underground Railroad Freedom Center, and until 2012 served as the chairman of the board of The Walt Disney Company.

Biography
John E. Pepper Jr. was born August 2, 1938, in Pottsville, Pennsylvania. He graduated from Portsmouth Abbey School (then Portsmouth Priory) in Rhode Island, then graduated from Yale University in 1960, where he served on the board of the Yale Daily News.

From 1963 to 2003, he served in various positions at Procter & Gamble, including chairman of the board from 2000 to 2002, and CEO. He served as chairman of the executive committee of the board of directors of The Procter & Gamble Company until December 2003. He then served as vice president of finance and administration at Yale University from January 2004 to December 2005. He was a director of The Walt Disney Company beginning in 2006 (chairman from 2007 to 2012) and of Boloco from 2007 to 2015, a Boston-based restaurant chain that his son John co-founded in 1997.

He served as a fellow of the Yale Corporation from 1995 to 2003, including two years as senior fellow, and also served as a member of the advisory committee of the Yale School of Management. He now serves on the board of trustees of Xavier University. He also serves on the boards of Boston Scientific and Motorola. He is a member of the executive committee of the Cincinnati Youth Collaborative, and he sits on the boards of the National Campaign to Prevent Teen Pregnancy and the Partnership for a Drug-Free America. He was inducted into the Junior Achievement U.S. Business Hall of Fame in 2008.

His children include Cincinnati politician David Pepper and North Carolina bluegrass musician Susan Pepper, as well as entrepreneur, labor activist and drone pilot John Pepper and kitesurfer Doug Pepper.

Bibliography
What Really Matters (Yale University Press, 2007)

References

1938 births
20th-century American businesspeople
21st-century American businesspeople
Pepper, John E.
Pepper, John E.
People from Pottsville, Pennsylvania
Pepper, John E.
Xavier University people
Procter & Gamble people
Motorola
American chief executives
American chairpersons of corporations
Chairmen of The Walt Disney Company
Disney executives
Portsmouth Abbey School alumni